Cabin John is a census-designated place and an unincorporated area in Montgomery County, Maryland, United States. Its original southern boundary encompassed a section of the Chesapeake and Ohio Canal (C&O) including locks 8–12, and the northern shore of the Potomac River. It is also the access point to Plummers Island, originally owned by The Washington Biologists’ Field Club and called “the most thoroughly studied island in North America.” Cabin John is the location of the Union Arch Bridge built between 1857 and 1864; at the time of its completion, the bridge embodied the longest single-span masonry arch in the world and remains the longest in the United States.

History
Early land records in 1715 cite Captain John's Run, now Cabin John Creek. The toponym "Cabin John" is thought to be a corruption of the name "Captain John", but the origin of the name remains unresolved. Immediately adjacent to the west end of the Union Arch Bridge, overlooking the river, was the historic Cabin John Bridge Hotel. Originally a refreshment stand and boarding house for bridge workers, it grew into "a sumptuous establishment frequented by the most powerful politicians and important social figures of Washington, D.C." In its heydays of the 1890s to early 1900s, "the hotel was so lavish and became so important a destination for Washingtonians that The Washington Post reported about it regularly."

Bordering Cabin John to the west is Carderock, Maryland where in 1936–1939 the Navy built the David Taylor Model Basin, one of the largest test facilities for ship design in the world. The test basin facility was originally planned for Cabin John, but instead the original 19.27 acre site, bought from Mary Ellen Bobinger, widow of the owner of the Cabin John Hotel, was used to build housing for workmen. "The Navy had 125 homes constructed… 100 for white workers and 25 for black." The homes were in two small neighborhoods, Cabin John Gardens, off MacArthur Blvd, and Carver Road, off Seven Locks Road. The Cabin John Gardens homes were constructed on the site of the former hotel and sold by the government to employees, with the land itself held as a cooperative—the only single-family development of its kind in the county. Carver Road homes were located about 1/3 of a mile to the northwest and originally rented out for $28 a month. "Of the families who moved there, many are still there, as adult children and grandchildren stayed on."

Geography
As an unincorporated area, Cabin John's boundaries are not officially defined. Cabin John is, however, recognized by the United States Census Bureau as a census-designated place, and by the United States Geological Survey as a populated place located at  (38.975110, −77.159281).  The borders are roughly defined as the area of land outlined by the Capital Beltway, Cabin John Parkway, and the Clara Barton Parkway.  

Prior to the Clara Barton Parkway, Cabin John was historically viewed as extending down to the northern bank of the Potomac and before the construction of the Cabin John Parkway in the mid-1960s, the area was also considered to extend north to River Road. The Cabin John Parkway is a spur road which connects the Clara Barton Parkway to Capital Beltway following the Cabin John Creek and passing under the Union Arch Bridge. Originally, the banks of the creek nearly reached the full width of the arch, but the parkway required approximately half the creek's width be converted into roadway.

Historically, Cabin John has been part of the region known as the Potomac Gorge (Potomac Palisades), which is an approximately 15-mile-long corridor or "fall zone" that transitions between the hard bedrock of the Piedmont to the softer rocks and soils of the Atlantic Coastal Plain and representing a drop in elevation from 140 feet to about 10 feet above sea level.

Demographics

At the 2000 census there were 1,734 people, 668 households, and 464 families residing in the area. The racial makeup of the area was 85.01% White, 3.63% African American, 0.23% Native American, 8.77% Asian, 0.46% from other races, and 1.90% from two or more races. Hispanic or Latino of any race were 2.71%.

Of the 668 households 36.2% had children under the age of 18 living with them, 60.9% were married couples living together, 5.7% had a female householder with no husband present, and 30.5% were non-families. 24.3% of households were one person and 8.5% were one person aged 65 or older. The average household size was 2.60 and the average family size was 3.11.

The age distribution was 25.8% under the age of 18, 4.7% from 18 to 24, 25.3% from 25 to 44, 34.9% from 45 to 64, and 9.3% 65 or older. The median age was 42 years. For every 100 females, there were 94.8 males. For every 100 females age 18 and over, there were 93.0 males.

The median household income was $95,692 and the median family income  was $125,493. Males had a median income of $84,112 versus $64,271 for females. The per capita income for the area was $52,401. None of the families and 2.4% of the population were living below the poverty line, including no one under age eighteen and 11.3% of those over 64.

See also
Cabin John-Brookmont, a census-designated place delineated in 1980 and 1990

References

External links

 CabinJohn.org, a community website

 
Census-designated places in Maryland
Census-designated places in Montgomery County, Maryland
Maryland populated places on the Potomac River
Upper class culture in Maryland